The following Union Army units and commanders fought in the Battle of Cold Harbor (May 31–June 12, 1864) of the American Civil War. The Confederate order of battle is listed separately. Order of battle compiled from the army organization May 31, 1864, army organization May 26-June 3, 1864, the casualty returns and the reports.

Abbreviations used

Military Rank
 LTG = Lieutenant General
 MG = Major General
 BG = Brigadier General
 Col = Colonel
 Ltc = Lieutenant Colonel
 Maj = Major
 Cpt = Captain

Other
 w = wounded
 mw = mortally wounded
 k = killed in action
 c = captured

Forces operating against Richmond May 31-June 5, 1864
LTG Ulysses S. Grant

Escort:
 5th United States Cavalry, Companies B, F and K

Army of the Potomac

MG George Meade

General Staff:
 Chief of Staff: MG Andrew A. Humphreys
 Assistant Adjutant General: BG Seth Williams
 Chief Quartermaster: BG Rufus Ingalls

General Headquarters:

Provost Guard: BG Marsena R. Patrick
 1st Massachusetts Cavalry, Companies C and D
 80th New York (20th Militia)
 3rd Pennsylvania Cavalry
 68th Pennsylvania
 114th Pennsylvania

Engineer Troops:
 50th New York Engineers
 Battalion United States Engineers

Guards and Orderlies:
 Independent Company Oneida (New York) Cavalry

Unattached:
 22nd New York Cavalry

II Corps

MG Winfield S. Hancock

Escort:
 1st Vermont Cavalry, Company M

V Corps

MG Gouverneur K. Warren

Provost Guard:
 12th New York Battalion

VI Corps

MG Horatio G. Wright

Escort:
 8th Pennsylvania Cavalry, Company A

IX Corps

MG Ambrose E. Burnside

General Staff:
 Chief of Staff: MG John G. Parke
 Chief of Artillery: Ltc J. Albert Monroe

Provost Guard:
 8th United States

Cavalry Corps

MG Philip H. Sheridan

Escort:
 6th United States

Artillery

Army of the James

XVIII Corps

MG William F. Smith

Forces operating against Richmond June 6-12, 1864
LTG Ulysses S. Grant

Escort:
 5th United States Cavalry, Companies B, F and K

Army of the Potomac

MG George Meade

General Staff:
 Chief of Staff: MG Andrew A. Humphreys
 Assistant Adjutant General: BG Seth Williams
 Chief Quartermaster: BG Rufus Ingalls

General Headquarters:

Provost Guard: BG Marsena R. Patrick
 1st Massachusetts Cavalry, Companies C and D
 80th New York (20th Militia)
 3rd Pennsylvania Cavalry
 68th Pennsylvania
 114th Pennsylvania

Engineer Troops:
 50th New York Engineers
 Battalion United States Engineers

Guards and Orderlies:
 Independent Company Oneida (New York) Cavalry

II Corps

MG Winfield S. Hancock

Escort:
 1st Vermont Cavalry, Company M

V Corps

MG Gouverneur K. Warren

Provost Guard:
 5th New York, Companies F and E

VI Corps

MG Horatio G. Wright

Escort:
 8th Pennsylvania Cavalry, Company A

IX Corps

MG Ambrose E. Burnside

General Staff:
 Chief of Staff: MG John G. Parke
 Chief of Artillery: Ltc J. Albert Monroe

Provost Guard:
 8th United States

Cavalry Corps

MG Philip H. Sheridan

Escort:
 6th United States

Artillery

Army of the James

XVIII Corps

MG William F. Smith

Notes

See also
 Wilderness Union order of battle
 Spotsylvania Court House Union order of battle

References
 Eicher, John H., and David J. Eicher. Civil War High Commands. Stanford, CA: Stanford University Press, 2001. .
 Rhea, Gordon C. Cold Harbor: Grant and Lee May 26-June 3, 1864. Baton Rouge: Louisiana State University Press, 2002. 
 U.S. War Department, The War of the Rebellion: a Compilation of the Official Records of the Union and Confederate Armies, U.S. Government Printing Office, 1880–1901.
 Wittenberg, Eric J. Glory Enough For All: Sheridan's Second Raid and the Battle of Trevilian Station. Washington, DC: Brassey's, Inc, 2001. 

American Civil War orders of battle